Lyon Township is the name of some places in the U.S. state of Michigan:

 Lyon Township, Oakland County, Michigan
 Lyon Township, Roscommon County, Michigan

See also 
 Lyons Township, Ionia County, Michigan

Michigan township disambiguation pages